High Peak or High Peaks may refer to:

Places
High Peak, Derbyshire, a borough in Derbyshire, England
High Peak Borough Council, local council of above borough
High Peak (UK Parliament constituency)
High Peak Estate, an area of Pennine moorland near High Peak Borough (above)
High Peak Junction, Cromford, location of former railway workshops
High Peaks (Maine), USA
High Peaks Wilderness Area, a Forest Preserve unit in New York, USA

Mountains and hills
High Peak (upland), another name for the Dark Peak uplands in the Peak District of England
High Peak, Devon, a partially eroded hill in Devon, UK
High Peak (Broadwater County, Montana) in Broadwater County, Montana
High Peak (Jefferson County, Montana) in Jefferson County, Montana
Kaaterskill High Peak, Greene County, New York, USA
Adirondack High Peaks
Catskill High Peaks

Other
High Peak Radio, a local radio station for above borough
High Peak Trail, a walking trail in Derbyshire, England
High Peak (bus company), a bus company in Derbyshire, England

See also